Raymond Ames Spruance (July 3, 1886 – December 13, 1969) was a United States Navy admiral during World War II. He commanded U.S. naval forces during one of the most significant naval battles that took place in the Pacific Theatre: the Battle of the Philippine Sea. He also commanded Task Force 16 at the Battle of Midway, comprising the carriers Enterprise and Hornet.  At Midway, dive bombers from the Enterprise crippled sank four larger carriers of the Imperial Japanese Navy.  Most historians consider Midway the turning point of the Pacific War.

Official Navy historian Samuel Eliot Morison characterized Spruance's performance as "superb", and he was nicknamed "electric brain" for his calmness even in moments of supreme crisis, a reputation enhanced by his successful tactics.  He emerged from the war as one of the greater admirals in American naval history.  After the war, Spruance was appointed President of the Naval War College, and later served as American ambassador to the Philippines.

Early life
Spruance was born in Baltimore, Maryland, on July 3, 1886, to Alexander and Annie Hiss Spruance. He was raised in Indianapolis, Indiana. Spruance attended Indianapolis public schools and graduated from Shortridge High School. From there, he went on to graduate from the U.S. Naval Academy in 1906, and received further, hands-on education in electrical engineering a few years later. His classmates included Arthur L. Bristol, William L. Calhoun, William A. Glassford, Charles C. Hartigan, Aubrey W. Fitch, Frank J. Fletcher, Robert L. Ghormley, Isaac C. Kidd, John S. McCain Sr., Leigh Noyes, Ferdinand L. Reichmuth, John H. Towers, Russell Willson, and Thomas Withers.

Career prior to World War II
Spruance's first duty assignment was aboard the battleship , an 11,400 ton veteran of the Spanish–American War. In July 1907 he transferred to the battleship  and was aboard her during the historic around the world cruise of the Great White Fleet from 1907 to 1909.

Spruance's seagoing career included command of the destroyers  from March 1913 to May 1914, three other destroyers, and the battleship .

In 1916 he aided in the fitting out of the battleship  and he served on board her from her commissioning in June 1916 until November 1917. During the last year of World War I he was assigned as Assistant Engineer Officer of the New York Naval Shipyard, and carried out temporary duty in London, England and Edinburgh, Scotland.

Following his return to the United States, Spruance served aboard transport ship USS Agamemnon, before he was ordered to Bath Iron Works in Bath, Maine, for duty in connection with fitting out of destroyer USS Aaron Ward in March 1919. He commanded that vessel during the patrols with the Atlantic Fleet until January 1920, when he assumed command of newly commissioned destroyer USS Percival in San Francisco, California.

He commanded the Percival during the sea trials off the California coast and during the patrol cruises with the Destroyer Force, Pacific Fleet until May 1922, when he was ordered to Washington, D.C., for duty in the Bureau of Engineering under Rear Admiral John K. Robison. While in that capacity he assumed additional duty as a member of the board on doctrine of aircraft in connection with fleet fire control.

Spruance served in Washington until early 1924, when he was ordered to the headquarters, Commander Naval Force in Europe. He served as Assistant Chief of Staff under Vice admiral Philip Andrews during the period of tensions between Greece and Turkey and was decorated with the Gold Cross of the Order of the Savior by the Government of Greece for his service.

Spruance ran a quiet bridge, without chit-chat; he demanded that orders be given concisely and clearly. In one incident a distraught officer rushed to report, "Captain, we've just dropped a depth charge over the stern!" "Well, pick it up and put it back," was Spruance's measured response.

He began attendance at the Naval War College in 1926, and graduated in 1927. Spruance served as executive officer of USS Mississippi from October 1929 to June 1931. He also held several engineering, intelligence, staff and Naval War College positions up to the 1940s. He served as an instructor at the Naval War College from 1935 to 1938. He commanded the battleship USS Mississippi from April 1938 to December 1939, when he was promoted to rear admiral. On February 26, 1940, Spruance reported as commandant of the 10th Naval District with headquarters at Naval Station Isla Grande in San Juan, Puerto Rico. On August 1, 1941, he finished his tour in Puerto Rico.

World War II

Before Midway
In the first months of World War II in the Pacific, Spruance commanded the four heavy cruisers and support ships of Cruiser Division Five from his flagship, the heavy cruiser . His division was an element of the task force built around the aircraft carrier  and commanded by Vice Admiral William F. Halsey, Jr. Early on, Halsey had led his task force on hit-and-run raids against the Japanese in the western Pacific: striking the Gilbert and Marshall islands in February 1942, Wake Island in March, and projecting the air power of the Doolittle Raid against the Japanese homeland in April. These raids were critical to moralesetting a new tone of aggressiveness by U.S. commanders while providing invaluable battle experience for the commanders and sailors of the U.S. Navy.

Midway

During the third week of May 1942, U.S. naval intelligence units confirmed that the Japanese would—by early June—invade Midway Island. Capturing and occupying Midway was the brainchild-plan of commander-in-chief of the Combined Fleet, Admiral Isoroku Yamamoto. With it he intended to significantly expand the Imperial Japanese Navy's outer defense perimeter across the central Pacific; and, he believed, this very powerful stroke against Midway would so severely threaten Hawaii and Pearl Harbor that the U.S. government would be induced to sue for peace. On the other hand, commander-in-chief of the U.S. Pacific Fleet, Admiral Chester Nimitz knew he must intercept the Japanese invasion fleet, and that he must give battle to the enemy aircraft carriers before they could project their overwhelming power against the naval air station at Midway.

Fewer than two days before launch from Pearl Harbor, Nimitz's commander of the fleet carrier force, Admiral Halsey, was hospitalized with severe shingles; Halsey immediately recommended Admiral Spruance to Nimitz as his replacement with Admiral Fletcher receiving overall command. Although Spruance was proven as a cruiser division commander, he had no experience handling carrier-air combat; Halsey reassured Nimitz, and he told Spruance and Fletcher to rely on their newly inherited staff, particularly Captain Miles Browning, a battle-proven expert in carrier warfare. Fletcher would command Task Force 17, but the task force flag ship, had been badly damaged at the Battle of the Coral Sea and the formation's other carrier, Lexington, had been sunk, but at Nimitz's behest Yorktown  was patched-repaired in "rush" time purposefully to join the Midway operation.

The U.S. Navy intercept force centered on the three carriers Enterprise, Hornet, and Yorktown, and their air-attack squadrons. It faced a Japanese invasion fleet organized into two groups: the air-attack task force of four carriers with support ships under command of Admiral Chūichi Nagumo, and the surface and occupation forces under Admiral Nobutake Kondō and others. Admiral Yamamoto commanded the combined invasion fleet from aboard his flagship .

At 0530 June 4, a scout plane from Midway sighted the Kido Butai, however the scout only reported sighting "Two carriers and battleships", and giving  course and speed.  Since US intelligence had reported the possibility that the Kido Butai would be operating in two separate task forces, that meant that Fletcher only knew the location of half of the carrier force.  Armed with this information, Fletcher ordered Spruance to launch a strike at the Japanese with Enterprise and Hornet while holding Yorktown in reserve in case the other Japanese carriers were discovered.  Since the Japanese planes were returning from the Midway strike, Spruance ordered that his strike be launched without delay so as to maximize the chances that the Japanese carriers would be caught while landing planes or spotting the next wave.  In this state the Japanese carriers would be extremely vulnerable.  Furthermore, Spruance ordered that the air squadrons fly directly to their targets before assembling every squadron into a proper formation, gambling that the attacks would leave the enemy carriers in disarray and delay the launching of their own counterstrike.  Though this gamble paid off, Enterprise air squadrons would pay a heavy price, flying in piece-meal and mostly without fighter escort.

The battle commenced on the morning of June 4; the first several waves of U.S. attack aircraft were badly beaten, both near Midway and at sea around the Japanese task force. Then U.S. dive bombers from Spruance's Enterprise flew to Nagumo's fleet of four carriers – which, fatefully, were without air cover. Most of Nagumo's attack planes had just returned from the first strike on Midway and were immobilized on the carrier hangers, while his combat air patrol cover planes were engaged with battling torpedo bombers from Hornet. Enterprise dive bombers critically damaged two Japanese carriers including Nagumo's flagship ; while the Yorktown air group, launched after Fletcher was confident that all Japanese carriers were accounted for, crippled the Soryu.  All three were eventually scuttled.

The surviving carrier, gave the Japanese some brief respite by sending strikes that again damaged Yorktown. But several hours later—near the end of daylight hours—a U.S. scout plane located Hiryū again. Fletcher quickly ordered his dive bombers to strike, which fatally damaged the fourth Japanese carrier; it was scuttled the next day. However a second strike from Hiryū would fatally cripple Fletcher's flagship, Yorktown and as a result, Fletcher passed command to Spruance, who would command the mop up phase of the battle.

The U.S. Navy counterforce sank all four Japanese carriers while losing one of its own, Yorktown. The repulse of the Japanese invasion fleet at Midway, and critically the destruction of the Kido Butai, allowed the U.S. to gain parity in the naval air war.  In 1949, naval historian Samuel Eliot Morison noted that Spruance was subjected to criticism for not pursuing the retreating Japanese and allowing the surface fleet to escape. But in summing up Spruance's performance in the battle, Morison wrote: "Fletcher did well, but Spruance's performance was superb. Calm, collected, decisive, yet receptive to advice; keeping in his mind the picture of widely disparate forces, yet boldly seizing every opening. Raymond A. Spruance emerged from the battle one of the greatest admirals in American naval history". For his actions at the battle of Midway Rear Admiral Spruance was awarded the Navy Distinguished Service Medal and cited as follows: "For exceptionally meritorious service ... as Task Force Commander, United States Pacific Fleet. During the Midway engagement which resulted in the defeat of and heavy losses to the enemy fleet, his seamanship, endurance, and tenacity in handling his task force were of the highest quality." Both Fletcher and Nimitz recommended Spruance for the Distinguished Service Medal for his role in the battle.

The Battle of Midway is considered by many to be a turning point of the war in the Pacific, along with the Guadalcanal campaign. Before Midway, a small and fractional U.S. Navy faced an overwhelmingly larger and battle-hardened Japanese Combined Fleet. After Midway, although the Japanese still held a temporary advantage in vessels and planes, the U.S. Navy and the nation gained confidence and, most critically, time. The setback in the Japanese timetable to encircle the Pacific gave the U.S. industrial machine time to crank up war production, and ultimately, to turn the advantage on Japan in the production of ships, planes, guns, and all the other matériel of war. The Battle of Midway infused the U.S. Pacific Navy with confidence. And with this battle the American forces gained, and afterwards continued to gain, hard combat experience; so the Japanese lost that crucial advantage as well.

Commanding the Fifth Fleet

Shortly after the Midway battle, Spruance became chief of staff to Admiral Nimitz, and in September 1942 was appointed as Deputy Commander in Chief of the Pacific Fleet.

In August 1943 Spruance was placed in command of the Central Pacific Force, which, on April 29, 1944, was redesignated as the Fifth Fleet. At that time, Admiral Nimitz instituted a unique arrangement in which the command of the vessels which made up the "Big Blue Fleet" alternated between Admiral William Halsey Jr., at which time it was identified as the Third Fleet and Task Force 38, and Admiral Spruance, when it became the Fifth Fleet and Task Force 58. When not in command of the fleet the admirals, and their staffs, were based at Pearl Harbor and planned future operations.

The two admirals were a contrast in styles. Halsey was aggressive and a risk taker. Spruance was calculating and cautious. Notwithstanding their different personalities, Spruance and Halsey were close friends. In fact, Spruance had a knack for getting along with difficult people, including his friend Admiral Kelly Turner, the hotheaded commander of 5th Fleet's amphibious force. One exception was Admiral John Towers, a constant critic of Spruance, whom Spruance came to despise for his naked ambition.

Most common sailors were proud to serve under Halsey; most higher-ranking officers preferred to serve under Spruance. Captain George C. Dyer of the light cruiser , who served under both Spruance and Halsey, summed up the view of many ship captains:

This gave rise to the description of Spruance as "an Admiral's admiral".

Spruance directed Operation Hailstone against the Japanese naval base Truk in February 1944 in which twelve Japanese warships, thirty-two merchant ships and 249 aircraft were destroyed. This occurred at the same time that Admiral Turner's forces were attacking Eniwetok Atoll in the Marshalls, about 700 miles to the east. Spruance himself directed a task group of battleships, cruisers and destroyers that left the main body to go after Japanese ships that were fleeing Truk, sinking the light cruiser  and destroyer . This was said to be the first time that a four-star admiral took part in a sea action aboard one of the ships engaged. Admiral Spruance commanded with deadly precision, reported an observer.

Battle of the Philippine Sea

While screening the American invasion of Saipan in June 1944, Spruance defeated the Japanese fleet in the Battle of the Philippine Sea. Although he broke the back of the Japanese naval air force by sinking three carriers, two oilers and destroying about 600 enemy airplanes (so many that the remaining Japanese carriers were used solely as decoys in the Battle of Leyte Gulf a few months later due to the lack of aircraft and aircrews to fly them) Spruance has been criticized for not being aggressive enough in exploiting his success in the Philippine Sea. Buell quotes Spruance speaking with Morison:

However, his actions were both praised and understood by the main persons ordering and directly involved in the battle. Admiral Ernest J. King said to him "Spruance, you did a damn fine job there. No matter what other people tell you, your decision was correct". Spruance's fast carrier commander, Marc Mitscher, told his chief of staff Arleigh Burke:

End of the Pacific War
For most of the war, Spruance preferred to use the heavy cruiser  , named for his hometown, as his flagship.  He shifted his flag to the old battleship  of the shore bombardment force after Indianapolis was struck by a Kamikaze off Okinawa.  When New Mexico was struck by two kamikaze on the night of 12 May 1945 a hasty search by Spruance's staff found the Admiral manning a fire hose amidship. Determining that New Mexico was not too badly damaged to remain on station Spruance kept her as his flagship for the rest of the campaign. Spruance later chose the battleship  as his flagship, as the huge Iowa-class battleship had both room for his staff and the speed to keep up with the fast carrier task forces.

Spruance received the Navy Cross for his actions at Iwo Jima and Okinawa.

Spruance succeeded Fleet Admiral Chester Nimitz as Commander in Chief, U.S. Pacific Fleet and Pacific Ocean Areas in November 1945, a few months after the end of the war.

On October 16, 1946, the former Secretary of War, Robert P. Patterson, presented the Army Distinguished Service Medal to Admiral Spruance, with citation as follows:

Post-war

Retirement

At the end of the Second World War Congress created a limited number of five-star ranks for the Army and the Navy, designated General of the Army and Fleet Admiral.  The Navy, by law, was limited to four Fleet Admirals; three of these appointments were obvious: Ernest King, Chester Nimitz and William Leahy.  The fourth was a choice between Halsey and Spruance, and after much deliberation, eventually Halsey was appointed in December 1945. Spruance's achievements were acknowledged by the unique distinction of a special act of Congress awarding him Admiral's full pay for life.  Spruance expressed his personal feelings on this matter as follows:

Spruance was President of the Naval War College from February 1946 until he retired from the Navy in July 1948. He was decorated with Order of Leopold and Croix de guerre with Palm by the Government of Belgium for his service for the Allied cause.

Shortly before his retirement, Spruance received the following Letter of Commendation from the Secretary of the Navy:

Later life
He was appointed as Ambassador to the Philippines by President Harry S. Truman, and served there from 1952 to 1955.

He received his Doctor of Jurisprudence (J.D.), honoris causa degree from Central Philippine University in 1955, an institution of higher learning founded by the American Baptist missionary, William Orison Valentine in 1905.

Spruance died in Pebble Beach, California, on December 13, 1969, and was buried with full military honors at Golden Gate National Cemetery near San Francisco. His wife, Margaret Dean (1888–1985), is buried alongside him, as are Fleet Admiral Chester Nimitz, his longtime friend Admiral Richmond K. Turner, and Admiral Charles A. Lockwood, an arrangement made by all of them while living. He was the grandfather of legendary theatre director Anne Bogart.

Personality
Spruance was an active man who thought nothing of walking eight or 10 miles a day. He was fond of symphonic music, and his tastes were generally simple. He never smoked, and drank little. He enjoyed hot chocolate and would make it for himself every morning. Besides his family, he loved the companionship of his pet schnauzer, Peter. Fit into his 70s, Spruance spent most of his retirement days wearing old khakis and work shoes and working in his garden and greenhouse; he loved to show them to visitors.

His achievements in the navy were well known, but himself much less. He did not discuss his private life, feelings, prejudices, hopes or fears, except with his family and his closest friends. He was modest and candid about himself. "When I look at myself objectively," he wrote in retirement, "I think that what success I may have achieved through life is largely due to the fact that I am a good judge of men. I am lazy, and I never have done things myself that I could get someone to do for me. I can thank heredity for a sound constitution, and myself for taking care of that constitution." About his intellect he was equally unpretentious: "Some people believe that when I am quiet that I am thinking some deep and important thoughts, when the fact is that I am thinking of nothing at all. My mind is blank."

Legacy

The main auditorium of the U.S. Naval War College, Newport, Rhode Island, is named Spruance Hall. A bust of Spruance is in the lobby.

The Indiana War Memorial in Indianapolis has a meeting room named for Spruance as well as displays honoring his career and that of the USS Indianapolis.

Cultural depictions
Spruance was portrayed by Glenn Ford (a US Naval Reserve officer himself) in the 1976 film Midway, and by Jake Weber in the 2019 film Midway.

Spruance is depicted as the controversial victor of Midway by G. D. Spradlin in the 1988 TV miniseries War and Remembrance. He is shown to be at loggerheads with his staff on numerous occasions and corrected by them once. The series, based on Herman Wouk's book of the same name, shows Spruance's decision to end the battle and retreat rather than confront the rest of the Japanese fleet as having been opposed by his subordinates, and he was mocked behind his back as "lacking the stomach." Yet the decision is hailed by the series's narrator as instrumental in sealing the American victory. Wouk writes in his book that "Spruance escaped [the Japanese fleet admiral] Yamamoto's terrible trap by acting on perfect military instinct. Not till many months later did American intelligence ferret out the facts."

Awards

Dates of rank
 United States Naval Academy Midshipman – July 2, 1903, Passed Midshipman – September 26, 1906

References

Further reading   

 
 
 
 
 
 

1886 births
1969 deaths
Ambassadors of the United States to the Philippines
Battle of Midway
Burials at Golden Gate National Cemetery
High Commissioners of the Trust Territory of the Pacific Islands
Military personnel from Baltimore
Naval War College alumni
Naval War College faculty
Presidents of the Naval War College
Recipients of the Distinguished Service Medal (US Army)
Recipients of the Navy Cross (United States)
Recipients of the Navy Distinguished Service Medal
United States Naval Academy alumni
United States Navy admirals
United States Navy World War II admirals
Shortridge High School alumni
20th-century American diplomats
20th-century American academics